Chitarra can refer to:
 Guitar, modern string instrument
 Gittern, medieval string instrument
 Spaghetti alla chitarra, a variety of egg pasta